P. jejuensis may refer to:

Pedobacter jejuensis, a Gram-negative bacterium of the genus Pedobacter.
Phycicoccus jejuensis, a Gram-positive bacterium.
Polaromonas jejuensis, a Gram-negative bacterium.